Mg is an electric locomotive used by Swedish State Railways for hauling freight trains. It was built in 17 copies by ASEA and was in service until 1980.

The Mg-series was built for the electrification of Norra Stambanan in the 1940s. It was steeper and more curved than the main lines in Southern Sweden, and single-track sections meant that long freight trains had to be used to make best use of line capacity. The D-series was not powerful enough and the Of-series was too long for the curves. But as experience of the building of bogie-locomotives increased, a Co'Co'-design was chosen for Mg, as the first bogie-locomotive in Sweden. More power also meant that the direct current motors from the D-series had to be replaced with the alternating current motors of the F-series. The machine room was not symmetric, so the loco was not the same on the right and left side. The Mg was the basis for the Ma-series built in the 1950s.

References

External links
 Järnväg.net on Mg 

ASEA locomotives
Mg
15 kV AC locomotives
Co′Co′ locomotives
Railway locomotives introduced in 1944
Standard gauge locomotives of Sweden
Co′Co′ electric locomotives of Europe